The men's K-1 1000 metres competition in canoeing at the 2008 Summer Olympics took place at the Shunyi Olympic Rowing-Canoeing Park in Beijing on 22 August.  The K-1 event is raced in single-person kayaks.

Competition consists of three rounds: the heats, the semifinals, and the final. All boats compete in the heats. The top finisher in each of the three heats advances directly to the final, while the next six finishers (places 2 through 7) in each heat move on to the semifinals. The top three finishers in each of the two semifinals join the heats winners in the final.

Schedule
All times are China Standard Time (UTC+8)

Medalists

Results

Heats
Qualification Rules: 1->Final, 2..7->Semifinals, Rest Out

Heat 1

Heat 2

Heat 3

Semifinals
Qualification Rules: 1..3->Final, Rest Out

Semifinal 1

Semifinal 2

Final

References

Sports-reference.com 2008 K-1 1000 m results.
Yahoo! August 18, 2008 sprint heat results - accessed August 19, 2008.
Yahoo! August 20, 2008 sprint semifinal results - accessed August 20, 2008.
Yahoo! August 22, 2008 sprint final results - accessed August 22, 2008.

Men's K-1 1000
Men's events at the 2008 Summer Olympics